The 2022 Malaysia Cup (Malay: Piala Malaysia 2022), officially known as the TM Piala Malaysia 2022 for sponsorship reasons, was the 96th edition of Malaysia Cup tournament organised by the Football Association of Malaysia (FAM) and the Malaysian Football League (MFL).

Kuala Lumpur City were the defending champions after defeating Johor Darul Ta'zim 2–0 in the previous final, but were eliminated by Terengganu in the quarter-finals.

Format 
In the competition, the top eleven teams from the 2022 Malaysia Super League were joined by the top five teams from the 2022 Malaysia Premier League. In this edition, the group stage was not played. The competition was played from 25 October to 26 November 2022, with 16 teams in the knockout stage which began in the round of 16, followed by quarter-finals, semi-finals and the final. This stage was played in two legs, except for the final which was played as a single leg. On 19 October 2022, the Malaysian Football League (MFL) announced that the away goals rule had been abolished.

Schedule and draw dates
The draw for the 2022 Malaysia Cup was held on 25 October 2022.

Seeding 
Teams were divided to their pots according to their placements in the 2022 Malaysia Super League and 2022 Malaysia Premier League. Pot A included the top 4 teams from the Super League, pot B included teams placed 5th and 6th in the Super League and the top 2 teams from the Premier League, and pot C included teams placed 7th to 11th in the Super League together with those placed 3rd to 5th in the Premier League.

Knockout stage

In the knockout phase, teams played against each other over two legs on a home-and-away basis, except for the final which was played as a single-leg game.

Bracket

Round of 16

The first legs were played on 26 and 27 October, and the second legs on 31 October and 1 November 2022.

|}

Quarter-finals

The first legs were played on 5 and 6 November, and the second legs on 11 and 12 November 2022.

|}

Semi-finals

The first legs were played on 15 and 16 November, and the second legs on 20 and 21 November 2022.

|}

Final

The final was played on 26 November 2022 at the Bukit Jalil National Stadium in Kuala Lumpur.

Statistics

Top goalscorers

Hat-tricks

Notes
(H) – Home game; (A) – Away game

Clean sheets

See also 
2022 Piala Sumbangsih
2022 Malaysia Super League
2022 Malaysia Premier League
2022 Malaysia M3 League
2022 Malaysia M5 League

References

External links 

2022 in Malaysian football
Malaysia Cup seasons
Malaysia Cup